Allison Leigh Alderson DeMarcus (born January 18, 1977) is an American actress, TV host and beauty queen who has competed in the Miss Teen USA, Miss USA and Miss America pageants. Alderson is married to Jay DeMarcus, the bassist in the band Rascal Flatts.

Biography
Alderson grew up in Jackson, Tennessee, and is a graduate of the University School of Jackson. She graduated cum laude with a degree in business administration from Rhodes College in 1999, where she served as president of the Chi Omega sorority. She won the Wall Street Journal Award for Excellence in Finance because she was the top finance student in her graduating class. As part of the Bryce Harlow Institute of Business and Government Affairs, she also studied at Georgetown University in Washington, DC.
Alderson's sister Amy held the Miss District of Columbia USA 1999 title, at the same time that Alderson was Miss Tennessee. Alderson's sister is married to country artist James Otto. Alderson was Miss Tennessee Teen USA 1994, Miss Tennessee 1999 and Miss Tennessee USA 2002.

On May 15, 2004, Alderson married Jay DeMarcus, bassist/pianist in the band Rascal Flatts, whom she met when she acted in the video for the band's song "These Days". The couple's first child, a daughter named Madeline Leigh DeMarcus, was born on December 17, 2010. Their son, Dylan Jay DeMarcus, was born on July 20, 2012.

Alderson currently works on the CMT show Hot 20 Countdown and is the regular host of the Miss Tennessee pageant, which is held in her hometown, Jackson. She has been a red-carpet-show host for the CMT Music Awards, a roving reporter and correspondent for the Miss America pageant, and a correspondent for CMT Insider, interviewing actors from Shia LaBeouf to Dolly Parton. She served as "style judge" for CMT's Karaoke Dokey and hosted Extreme Makeover: Quickbooks Edition.

Off camera, Alderson is on the boards of directors of Vanderbilt Children's Hospital, the Women's Fund of the Community Foundation of Middle Tennessee, the Make-A-Wish Foundation of Middle Tennessee and the Miss Tennessee Scholarship Pageant. She also volunteers for Chi Omega, the Nashville Symphony League, the Nashville Humane Association, the Nashville Ballet, Second Harvest Food Bank, the Nashville Alliance and the Oasis Center.

References

External links
CMT Shows
Institute on Business and Government Affairs (IBGA) official website

1977 births
Living people
Georgetown University alumni
Miss America 2000 delegates
1994 beauty pageant contestants
20th-century Miss Teen USA delegates
Miss Tennessee winners
Miss Tennessee USA winners
Miss USA 2002 delegates
People from Jackson, Tennessee
20th-century American people